This is a list of notable prehistoric sites in Morocco. The historical record in Morocco begins around 650 BCE, with the arrival of the Phoenicians and the founding of the settlement of Mogador. These sites have been dated by archaeologists earlier than that.

Adrar Metgourine, near Akka
Aguerd
Aïn Maarouf
Ashakar, near Tangier (El-Khil caves)
Assif Kelmt
Al Mahbas, Sahara
Al Farciya, Sahara
El Mries
Bazina du Gour, Meknes
Caf  el Ghar, near Tetouan
Cave of the Rhinocerosses, Casablanca
Dar es Soltane
Djebel Irhoud
Draa river
El Khenzira
Figuig
Gueltat Zemmour, Sahara
Hawza, Sahara
Ifrane of the Little Atlas/Jbel Atlas Saghru
Ifri Oudadane
Island of Essaouira
Jdririya, Sahara
Mzoura Cromlech, near Asilah (funerary monument, megalith, cromlech)
Rouazi
Smara, Sahara
Taforalt, Oujda (cf. Nassarius shells)
Taouz, Tafilalt
Tensift, Marrakech
Waramdaz
Yagour, High Atlas Mountains near Oukaimden

References

Prehistoric

Morocco